New Mr. Vampire 2, also known as The Funny Vampire, is a 1991 Hong Kong comedy horror film directed by Ng Kwok-Hao. This film is the sequel to the first film New Mr. Vampire.

Cast 
 Pauline Wong Siu-Fung as Xiao Feng
 Huang Ha as Vampire
 Tai Bo as Bao
 Chin Yuet-Sang as Master Xing's fellow disciple
 Jack Lung Sai-Ga as Master Xing
 Wong Kwan-Hong as Kang
 Wong Yi-Yin as Ting Ting
 Wong Dik as Little Vampire

Home media

VHS

LaserDisc

VCD

References

Hong Kong comedy horror films
1990s comedy horror films